The men's all-around competition for gymnastics artistic at the 2019 Southeast Asian Games in Philippines was held on 1 December 2019 at Rizal Memorial Coliseum.

The top eight scorers for each apparatus move on to the event finals.

Carlos Yulo bagged the gold in the men's all-around after placing first in the floor exercise and the horizontal bars and second on the still rings, vault, and parallel bars.

Vietnam's Đinh Phương Thành and Lê Thanh Tùng brought home the event's silver and bronze after placing second and third, respectively.

Results

References

Men's artistic all-around